Andrew John Street  (born 11 June 1963) is a British businessman and Conservative Party politician who was the managing director of John Lewis from 2007 to 2016, when he resigned to run for Mayor of the West Midlands. Street won the May 2017 mayoral election, defeating Siôn Simon with 50.4% of the vote in the second round. He was re-elected in 2021, defeating Labour candidate Liam Byrne. He is Britain's first openly gay directly-elected metro mayor.

Early life 
Born in Banbury, Oxfordshire, Street moved to Birmingham with his parents, both scientists, when he was ten months old, growing up in Northfield and Solihull. He attended Green Meadow Infants School, Langley Junior School and King Edward's School in Edgbaston. He studied Politics, Philosophy and Economics at Keble College, Oxford, where he was President of the Oxford University Conservative Association in the Trinity term of 1984.

Business career 
After graduating, Street harboured ambitions to be a social worker, but he was turned down by Birmingham City Council. He was also turned down for the Marks & Spencer training scheme. Street thus started his career at the John Lewis Partnership in 1985 as a trainee at Brent Cross.

After roles in department stores, head office and manufacturing units, Street became managing director of John Lewis Milton Keynes in 1993, moving to the same role at Bluewater five years later. In 2000 he became supply chain director and then, two years later, director of personnel. He became managing director in 2007 and, during his tenure at the top, oversaw a 50% increase in gross sales to over £4.4 billion, a doubling in the number of stores and the growth of the company's online sales department, in spite of the Great Recession.

Political career

Mayor of the West Midlands
On 29 September 2016, Street was officially selected by Conservatives to stand in the first election for Mayor of the West Midlands Combined Authority, which took place on 4 May 2017. Street said: "[The Combined Authority] will determine how we create wealth here and what type of society the West Midlands will become. (...) Our economy is being renewed but we have much more to do to ensure everybody feels the benefit. Our mission is therefore to build the economic powerhouse of Britain in an inclusive way. That will need leadership from somebody who has a proven record, can bring people together and can represent us with passion. This election needs to go beyond traditional political loyalties and I look forward to seeking voters' support for the job ahead." The following day, it was confirmed that Street would leave John Lewis at the end of October 2016. He was succeeded by Paula Nickolds, who assumed the role in January 2017.

In a speech at the 2016 Conservative Party conference, Street declared his support for Birmingham's bid to host the 2026 Commonwealth Games. He also announced that he would seek to address the "imbalance" in transportation spending that sees London receive seven times as much spending on transport infrastructure per head as the West Midlands does. Street said that fighting inequality would also be a priority, as "social challenges can only be met when everybody shares the fruits of economic progress", saying that he would draw on the lessons of Joseph Chamberlain and his own experiences with the John Lewis Partnership, which shares profits with all of its employees. He also called for a series of debates with Labour candidate Siôn Simon and Liberal Democrat candidate Beverley Nielsen.

Street was endorsed by The Lord Jones of Birmingham, a businessman and crossbench peer who formerly served as Minister of State for Trade and Investment under Gordon Brown.

Street was elected Mayor of the West Midlands on 4 May 2017 with 238,628 votes (216,280 first preferences, and 22,348 transfers) in the second round of voting, and in October of the same year was placed 82nd on commentator Iain Dale's list of 'The Top 100 Most Influential People on the Right'. Upon taking office, he became entitled to the style of Mayor.

Street was re-elected as Mayor on 6 May 2021 with 314,669 votes, 54% of the total votes cast after second preference votes were included.

Political views
Street has been an outspoken critic of continually-rising business rates, arguing that "property is the way retailers have made money historically and we need a system that is a reflection of the future", though he does not believe that online transaction taxes are the answer.  Street supported Liz Truss as Prime Minister  before her very short time in office.

Other posts 
In addition to his business career, Street has worked extensively in local economic development, being named Chairman of the Greater Birmingham and Solihull Local Enterprise Partnership in April 2011. The announcement of his appointment came weeks after the news that John Lewis would open a flagship store in the newly developed Grand Central shopping centre above New Street station. Street stepped down from this role in September 2016 after announcing his intention to run for Mayor of the West Midlands. He has been lead non-executive director for the Department for Communities and Local Government as well as a member of Prime Minister David Cameron's Business Advisory Group.

Street was appointed a Commander of the Order of the British Empire (CBE) in the 2015 Birthday Honours for services to economic growth. He was named the 'Most Admired Leader' of the year by business magazine Management Today in 2014. He received the 'President's award' from the Greater Birmingham Chambers of Commerce in for his services to the region. He holds honorary degrees with Birmingham City University, the University of Birmingham and Aston University.

Personal life 
For more than 20 years from his school days, Street was involved with the charity Birmingham Young Volunteers (BYV) Adventure Camps, taking underprivileged children nominated by Birmingham Social Services to Wales for adventure camps. Street is a supporter of Aston Villa F.C. and runs half-marathons. He is Vice-Chairman of Performances Birmingham Limited, which is responsible for running the city's Symphony and Town Halls.

Street is openly gay. He is a close friend of the Conservative MP Michael Fabricant with whom he co-owns a holiday home in Snowdonia. In December 2021, Fabricant described his relationship with Street as being life partners.

References

External links
 Official campaign website 
 

Living people
British businesspeople
1963 births
People educated at King Edward's School, Birmingham
Alumni of Keble College, Oxford
Presidents of the Oxford University Conservative Association
Commanders of the Order of the British Empire
John Lewis Partnership people
English LGBT politicians
Gay politicians
LGBT mayors of places in the United Kingdom
21st-century English LGBT people
Conservative Party (UK) mayors